Sustainable seafood advisory lists and certification are programs aimed at increasing consumer awareness of the environmental impact and sustainability of their seafood purchasing choices. 

California-based Seafood Watch and Marine Conservation Society's fish online are some of the best-known guides. One of the best-known certification programs is Marine Stewardship Council's scheme for consumer seafood products.

Other programs include regional guides, such as the GoodFish Project, a sustainable seafood guide produced by the Australian Marine Conservation Society (AMCS). In Canada, SeaChoice produces assessments and recommendations using the traffic light system, while recommendation of restaurants is done by Vancouver Aquarium's Ocean Wise.

Guides and advisory lists
Aquarium of the Bay Sustainable Seafood Alliance https://www.aquariumofthebay.org/conservation/sustainable/
InSeason Fish A sustainable seafood guide for India
Marine Conservation Society (MCS), Good Fish Guide (UK and Northeast Atlantic)
 The Monterey Bay Aquarium Seafood Watch (recommendations)
 The Seafood Guide developed by Good Fish Foundation and WWF Europe
Greenpeace: Seafood Red list
Australian Marine Conservation Society (AMCS) produces Australia's Sustainable Seafood Guide 
Royal Forest and Bird Protection Society of New Zealand, Best Fish Guide
Audubon Society's National Seafood Wallet Card (US)
Monterey Fish Market Seafood advisory list (West Coast, US)
Canada’s Seafood Guide (SeaChoice), initiative of Sustainable Seafood Canada 
The Environmental Justice Foundation (EJF) Consumer Guide To Prawns

Certification and labelling
The Marine Stewardship Council has a certification program for consumer seafood products, and lists certified products on its website 
Ocean Wise, a Vancouver Aquarium conservation program certifying restaurants, and publishing a dining guide.
Sustainable Fishery Advocates operates the FishWise program for labeling seafood by retailers.
Friends of the Sea is an independent organization that developed certification schemes for products from sustainable fisheries and aquaculture. The certification schemes also include standards for the reduction of carbon footprint and social accountability.

Consumer health
Oceana's Campaign to Stop Seafood Contamination (USA)

See also 
Conservation status
Ecolabel
Ethical consumerism
Overfishing

.
Consumer guides
Fish by conservation status
Sustainable food system
Works about food and drink